Marty O'Kane played guitar for the rock band Spiraling from 2002-2008. In 2010,  Marty played guitar in April Smith's Great Picture Show for the album Songs for a Sinking Ship.  In 2012, Marty debuted his solo performance at Hoboken’s Northern Soul. Marty O'Kane currently resides in Hoboken, New Jersey.

Musical style
Playing instruments ranging from guitar, ukulele, accordion and sometimes bass with boyish Vocals, Marty's music is heavily influenced by Paul McCartney (Beatles) and Rush.

Discography 
Transmitter (2002)
Challenging Stage (2004)
Time Travel Made Easy (2008)
Songs for a Sinking Ship (2010)

References

Guitarists from New Jersey
American rock guitarists
American male guitarists
Living people
Year of birth missing (living people)